Track 61 may refer
Track 61 (Boston)
Track 61 (New York City)